Brightroam is a deep discount international roaming mobile provider owned by iRoam Mobile Solutions a subsidiary of Sea Change Corporation. The company is headquartered in Toronto, Ontario, Canada and provides global cellular communications to corporations and individuals at reduced costs associated with international roaming.

Brightroam by iRoam

Founded in 2006, Brightroam Inc began as a subsidiary of Roadpost inc, leveraging their 15 years of history in providing short term cellular and international roaming services.  The goal of the company was to provide international roaming services to North Americans, both to undercut roaming rates for GSM subs and to provide services to CDMA subscribers.  Brightroam based its business plan around key factors such as highly Web-enabled automated sales, provisioning and customer service platform to reduce costs and pricing.

iRoam Mobile takeover

Effective December 22, 2010, BrightRoam was purchased by iRoam Mobile Solutions Inc.

iRoam Mobile Solutions purchased Brightroam to complement its connectivity and security products and services for the mobile and roaming user, including iPass Inc., mobile device management and existing enterprise cellular roaming solutions.  

With this purchase, iRoam assumed responsibility for all Brightroam customers, including maintaining 24/7 customer service, SIM cards delivery, activation as well as the user portal to allow users to manage their accounts.

Telehop merger

In May 2014, Telehop Communications Inc. acquired the business assets of iRoam Mobile Solutions Inc., a Canadian company that operates under the iRoam and Brightroam brands in North America. The company provides global cellular phone communications services, SIM cards, roaming devices and worldwide Wi-Fi roaming solutions that are sold directly and through distributors for use around the world. In line with the acquisition, G3 Telecom's G3 Wireless and Brightroam will form part of iRoam's consumer branding.

Alliances 

Brightroam holds alliances with various international cellular providers such as:
O2 (UK),
TIM Hellas (Greece),
China Mobile, 
Swisscom, 
TIM (Italy),
and Vodafone (Germany).

References

External links
http://www.businesswire.com/news/home/20140507006643/en/Telehop-Announces-Acquisition-Global-SIM-Wi-Fi-Roaming#.U6iOvfldXw1

Telecommunications companies established in 2006
2006 establishments in Ontario
Canadian companies established in 2006